Royal blue is a colour.

Royal Blue may also refer to:

 Royal Blue (train), a passenger train between New York City and Washington, D.C., United States
 Royal Blue (yacht), a maxi yakmn
cht
 Royal Blue, Tennessee, a community in Campbell County, Tennessee, United States
 Royal Blue (pigeon), an RAF messenger pigeon of World War II
 Myscelia cyaniris or royal blue, a brush-footed butterfly of Central and northern South America
 Orachrysops regalis or royal blue, a butterfly in the family Lycaenidae found in South Africa

See also
 Royal Blue Coach Services, a former coach operator in England